Sir Alan Cook (1922–2004) was a British physicist.

Alan or Allan Cook or Cooke may also refer to:
Allan Cook (born 1941), Australian rules footballer who played with Geelong 
Alan Cook (footballer) (born 1992), Scottish footballer
Allan Cooke (1930–2010), Australian rules footballer who played with Richmond
Alan Cooke (table tennis) (born 1966), English table tennis international
Alan Cooke (politician), Irish politician and judge
Alan Cooke Kay (born 1932), American lawyer and judge